Clavipalpula aurariae is a moth of the family Noctuidae. It is found in Japan and Taiwan.

The wingspan is 37–43 mm.

Subspecies
Clavipalpula aurariae aurariae
Clavipalpula aurariae formosana G. Ronkay L. Ronkay, P. Gyulai & Hacker, 2010 (Taiwan)

References

Moths described in 1880
Hadeninae
Moths of Japan
Moths of Taiwan